Gamil is the Egyptian pronunciation of the masculine given name Jamil.

It is also a family name.

People with this given name
Gamil Agamaliev (born 1974), Azerbaijani chess grandmaster
Marc Lépine (born as Gamil Rodrigue Liass Gharbi; 1964–1989), Canadian mass murderer
Gamil Ratib (born 1926), Egyptian actor
Gamil Agamaliev (born 1974), Azerbaijani chess grandmaster
Marc Lépine (born as Gamil Rodrigue Liass Gharbi; 1964–1989), Canadian mass murderer
Gamil Ratib (born 1926), Egyptian actor

People with this family name
Sanaa Gamil (1932–2002), Egyptian actress
Soliman Gamil (1924–1994), Egyptian composer and qanun player

See also
Gamil (disambiguation)
Cemal
Cemil
Jamal
Gamal (disambiguation)
Jamila

Arabic masculine given names
Arabic-language surnames